Heat shock protein 105 kDa is a protein that in humans is encoded by the HSPH1 gene.

Interactions
HSPH1 has been shown to interact with Cofilin 1.

References

Further reading